The Saint Philippe was a 74-gun ship of the line of the French Royal Navy. She was built at Brest Dockyard, designed and constructed by Laurent Hubac. She was nominally a three-decker, but in practice the upper deck was divided into armed sections aft and forward of the unarmed waist, making the upper deck equivalent to a quarterdeck and forecastle.

She took part in the Battle of Cherchell on 24 August 1665 (as flagship of François de Bourbon-Vendôme, Duc de Beaufort) and in the Battle of Solebay on 7 June 1672 (as flagship of Vice-admiral Jean d'Estrées). She was refitted at Brest from 2 August to 11 September 1683, emerging with 70 guns, and recommissioned in June 1689 as the flagship of chef d'escadre Jean Gabaret. She took part in the Battle of Beachy Head on 10 July 1690 (as flagship of Alain Emmanuel de Coëtlogon) and in the Battle of Barfleur on 29 May 1692. Following the latter battle, she was beached at La Hogue where she was attacked and burnt by the English on 2 June 1692

Sources and references 

Nomenclature des Vaisseaux du Roi-Soleil de 1661 a 1715. Alain Demerliac (Editions Omega, Nice – various dates).
The Sun King's Vessels (2015) - Jean-Claude Lemineur; English translation by François Fougerat. Editions ANCRE.  
Winfield, Rif and Roberts, Stephen (2017) French Warships in the Age of Sail 1626-1786: Design, Construction, Careers and Fates. Seaforth Publishing. . 

 Vaisseaux de Ligne Français de 1682 à 1780 1

Ships of the line of the French Navy
1660s ships